CORSIKA (COsmic Ray SImulations for KAscade) is a physics computer software for simulation of extensive air showers induced by high energy cosmic rays, i.e. protons and atomic nuclei, as well as Gamma rays (photons), electrons, and neutrinos. It may be used up to and beyond the highest energies of 100 EeV.

In the current version the program utilizes the hadronic interaction models EPOS, QGSJET, and DPMJET, which are based on Gribov-Regge theory, and SIBYLL based on a minijet model for high
energies. Hadronic interactions at lower energies are described either by the GHEISHA module, by FLUKA, or by the UrQMD model. Electromagnetic interactions are treated by an adapted version of the  EGS4 code,
customized by including the Landau–Pomeranchuk–Migdal effect relevant at higher energies.

It can be used to simulate the generation of Cherenkov radiation, radio emission (Askaryan radiation), and atmospheric neutrinos.

A complete rewrite of CORSIKA in C++ named CORSIKA 8 is currently work in progress.

References

External links 
 The Automated Air Shower Generation with CORSIKA at the Computing Center of IN2P3 PS
 Recent Extensions to the Air Shower Simulation Program CORSIKA, proceedings of the 25th ICRC.

Physics software